Lost Illusions is a 2021 French drama film directed by Xavier Giannoli, from a screenplay by Giannoli and Jacques Fieschi, based upon the first two parts of Illusions perdues (1837–43) by Honoré de Balzac. It stars Benjamin Voisin, Xavier Dolan, Vincent Lacoste, Cécile de France, Gérard Depardieu, and Jeanne Balibar.

It had its world premiere at the 78th Venice Film Festival on 5 September 2021. It is  released in France on 20 October 2021, by Gaumont. The film received fifteen nominations at the 47th César Awards, winning in seven categories, including Best Film,  Best Adapted Screenplay, Best Cinematography, Best Supporting Actor for Lacoste, and Most Promising Actor for Voisin.

Plot summary
In 1820s France, 20-year-old poet Lucien de Rubempré travels from his provincial home in Angoulême to Paris after a contentious affair with a local society lady. He is sensitive, idealistic, handsome and determined to force the literary world to take notice. Contrary to his expectations, however, he discovers that he must make ends meet by writing scurrilous theater reviews and ends up beholden to the world of low-brow journalism. At the behest of his crass boss, Étienne Lousteau, Lucien succumbs entirely to bribery and cronyism, achieving wealth and standing only at the cost of his artistic integrity and former friendships. In a last attempt to free himself from the all-consuming filth he is undone by his greatest weakness, his desire to transcend his low origins and illegitimate birth by buying a title of nobility. This too proves illusory and finally he is defeated and socially destroyed by the prevailing "fake news" cycle, returning home to defeat and obscurity.

Cast
 Benjamin Voisin as Lucien de Rubempré
 Xavier Dolan as Raoul Nathan
 Vincent Lacoste as Étienne Lousteau
 Cécile de France as Marie-Louise-Anaïs de Bargeton
 Gérard Depardieu as Dauriat
 Jeanne Balibar as Marquise d'Espard
 Salomé Dewaels as Coralie
 André Marcon
 Jean-François Stévenin
 Louis-Do de Lencquesaing

Production
In September 2019, it was announced Benjamin Voisin, Xavier Dolan, Vincent Lacoste, Cécile de France, Gérard Depardieu, Jeanne Balibar, André Marcon, Jean-François Stévenin and Louis-Do de Lencquesaing had joined the cast of the film, with Xavier Giannoli directing from a screenplay by himself and Jacques Fieschi, based upon the novel Illusions perdues by Honoré de Balzac. Principal photography began in July 2019.

Reception
On the review aggregator website Rotten Tomatoes, 92% of 51 reviews are positive; the "critic's consensus" states that the film "honors its classic source material with a beautifully acted drama that untangles knotty themes with infectious energy."

References

External links

French drama films
Films set in 1837
Films set in 1843
Films about poets
Films directed by Xavier Giannoli
2021 drama films
Films based on works by Honoré de Balzac
2020s French films
2020s French-language films
Best Film César Award winners